The Heung Yee Kuk functional constituency, formerly called the Rural functional constituency, is a functional constituency in the elections for the Legislative Council of Hong Kong first created in 1991. The constituency is composed of the chairman and vice chairmen of the Heung Yee Kuk and the ex officio, special and co-opted councillors of the full Council of the Kuk. One of the functional constituencies with the fewest electorates, it had only 155 registered voters in 2020. It corresponds to the Heung Yee Kuk Subsector in the Election Committee.

Since the 2016 Legislative Council election, it has been represented by the chairman of the Kuk, Kenneth Lau, succeeding his father, former longtime Kuk chairman Lau Wong-fat who held the seat from 1991 to 2004 and from 2008 until he stepped down in 2016 due to his absence from the office because of ill health. Lau Wong-fat's tenure was interrupted when he represented the District Council functional constituency from 2004 to 2008 while Kuk vice chairman Lam Wai-keung took the seat in his place. No actual election has been held since its creation as all candidates have been uncontested.

Return Members

Rural (1991–1997)

Heung Yee Kuk (1997–present)

Electoral Results
Instant-runoff voting system was used from 1998 to 2021. Since 2021, first-past-the-post voting system is in use.

2020s

2010s

2000s

1990s

References

Constituencies of Hong Kong
1991 establishments in Hong Kong
Constituencies of Hong Kong Legislative Council
Functional constituencies (Hong Kong)
Heung Yee Kuk
Constituencies established in 1991